Luso Portugal Half Marathon or Luso Meia Maratona de Portugal is an annual half marathon contested every October in Lisbon, Portugal.

A new, faster course was established for the race in 2010 and 25 km record holder Mary Keitany duly responded by setting a women's course record of 1:08:46. She returned the following year and defended her title in another women's course record of 1:07:54 hours, while Silas Sang had his third victory in the men's competition.

Winners 
Key:

References

External links 
Official Website
2009 race overview from IAAF

Half marathons in Portugal
Autumn events in Portugal
Recurring sporting events established in 2000
2000 establishments in Portugal
Sports competitions in Lisbon
Annual events in Lisbon